Municipal election for Biratnagar took place on 13 May 2022, with all 122 positions up for election across 19 wards. The electorate elected a mayor, a deputy mayor, 19 ward chairs and 76 ward members. An indirect election will also be held to elect five female members and an additional three female members from the Dalit and minority community to the municipal executive.

Nagesh Koirala from Nepali Congress was elected as the new mayor of Metropolitan city.

Background 

The first election after the city was declared as a metropolitan city was held in 2017. Electors in each ward elect a ward chair and four ward members, out of which two must be female and one of the two must belong to the Dalit community.

Bhim Parajuli from Nepali Congress was elected as the first mayor of the metropolitan city in the previous election.

Candidates 
In accordance with the decision of central leaders of Nepali Congress, CPN (Maoist Centre), People's Socialist Party, CPN (Unified Socialist) and Rastriya Janamorcha, an alliance was created to contest local elections in some local units. In Biratnagar, Nagesh Koirala from Nepali Congress was the candidate for mayor from the alliance and Amrendra Yadav from People's Socialist party was the candidate for deputy mayor.

Mayoral candidates

Deputy mayoral candidates

Opinion poll

Exit polls

Results

Mayoral election

Deputy mayoral election

Ward results 

|-
! colspan="2" style="text-align:centre;" | Party
! Chairpersons
! Members
|-
| style="background-color:;" |
| style="text-align:left;" |CPN (Unified Marxist-Leninist)
| style="text-align:center;" | 9
| style="text-align:center;" | 33
|-
| style="background-color:;" |
| style="text-align:left;" |Nepali Congress
| style="text-align:center;" | 6
| style="text-align:center;" | 33
|-
| style="background-color:;" |
| style="text-align:left;" |People's Socialist Party, Nepal
| style="text-align:center;" | 2
| style="text-align:center;" | 8
|-
| style="background-color:gold;" |
| style="text-align:left;" |Rastriya Prajatantra Party
| style="text-align:center;" | 1
| style="text-align:center;" | 0
|-
| style="background-color:;" |
| style="text-align:left;" |Independent
| style="text-align:center;" | 1
| style="text-align:center;" | 2
|-
! colspan="2" style="text-align:right;" | Total
! 19
! 76
|}

Summary of results by ward

Results for municipal executive election 
The municipal executive consists of the mayor, who is also the chair of the municipal executive, the deputy mayor and ward chairs from each ward. The members of the municipal assembly will elect five female members and three members from the Dalit and minority community to the municipal executive.

Municipal Assembly composition

Results

Municipal Executive composition

See also 
 2022 Nepalese local elections
 2022 Lalitpur municipal election
 2022 Kathmandu municipal election
 2022 Janakpur municipal election
 2022 Pokhara municipal election

Notes

References

Biratnagar